Synchiropus novaehiberniensis, the New Ireland dragonet, is a species of fish in the family Callionymidae, the dragonets. It is found in the Western Pacific Ocean.

Etymology
The fish is named after the island the fish was found at.

References

novaehiberniensis
Fish of the Pacific Ocean
Taxa named by Ronald Fricke
Fish described in 2016